Terje may refer to:

Terje (name), a form of the Scandinavian name Torgeir
Tria, a village in the commune of Derna, Bihor, Romania